Dadu Majra is a village located in Fatehgarh Sahib district in Punjab, India. The village is situated 23 km away from Fatehgarh Sahib district  headquarter. According to the 2011 census data of India Dadu Majra village has a total population of 1,586 peoples.

Population

References 

Villages in Fatehgarh Sahib district